René-Laurent Vuillermoz (born in Aosta on ) is a retired Italian biathlete.

He competed in the 2002, 2006 and 2010 Winter Olympics for Italy. His best finish is 8th, as a member of the Italian relay team in 2006. His best individual performance is 13th, in the 2006 pursuit.

As of February 2013, his best finish at a Biathlon World Championships is 4th, in the 2007 relay. His best individual performance is 9th, in the sprint of the same year.

As of February 2013, he has earned five Biathlon World Cup medals, including two individual medals.  He has two silvers, in the mixed relay at Pyeongchang in 2007/08 and the men's relay in Antholz from 2011/12. He also has two individual bronze medals, from sprint races at Ruhpolding in 2004/05 and Oberhof in 2006/07 His best overall finish in the Biathlon World Cup is 27th, in 2005/06 .

World Cup Podiums

References 

1977 births
Biathletes at the 2002 Winter Olympics
Biathletes at the 2006 Winter Olympics
Biathletes at the 2010 Winter Olympics
Italian male biathletes
Living people
Olympic biathletes of Italy
People from Aosta
Sportspeople from Aosta Valley